Saleem Sherwani (Urdu: ﺳﻠﯿﻢ ﺷﻴﺮوﺍﻧﻰ; born 21 June 1962) is a former field hockey player from Pakistan. He won a gold medal with the Men's National Hockey Team at the 1984 Summer Olympics in Los Angeles, California. He was born in Vehari, Punjab, Pakistan.

See also
 Pakistan Hockey Federation

References

External links
 

1962 births
Living people
Pakistani male field hockey players
Olympic field hockey players of Pakistan
Olympic gold medalists for Pakistan
Olympic medalists in field hockey
Medalists at the 1984 Summer Olympics
Field hockey players at the 1984 Summer Olympics
Field hockey players from Vehari
Asian Games medalists in field hockey
Field hockey players at the 1986 Asian Games
Asian Games silver medalists for Pakistan
Medalists at the 1986 Asian Games
20th-century Pakistani people